The Monumental Square (Spanish: Plaza Monumental) is a square located in Alcaraz, Spain. It was declared Bien de Interés Cultural in 1945.

References 

Buildings and structures in Castilla–La Mancha
Tourist attractions in Castilla–La Mancha
Bien de Interés Cultural landmarks in the Province of Albacete